Giese is a German surname. Since the mid-19th century,
people with this name have migrated throughout the world and now form an extensive diaspora
in countries such as the United States and Australia, where they have lived for several generations.

Notable people with the surname Giese include:

 Albrecht Giese (1524–1580), councilman and diplomat from Danzig
 Bernd Giese (born 1940), German professor of chemistry
 Dan Giese (born 1977), American retired Major League Baseball pitcher
 Erich Giese (1887–1917), German naval officer
 Georg Giese (1497–1562), merchant from Danzig
 Godehard Giese (born 1972), German actor
 Harry Giese (1903–1991), German theatre and voice actor
 Harry C. Giese (1913–2000), Australian administrator, public servant and community leader
 Horst Giese (1926–2008), East German actor
 Kathrin Giese, East German sprint canoer who competed in the 1980s
 Kenyon E. Giese (born 1933), American politician
 Maria Giese, American film director and screenwriter
 Max Giese (1879–1935), German engineer and inventor
 Richard Giese (1924–2010), principal flautist with the New Zealand Symphony Orchestra (1962-1986)
Richard Mclean Giese, known professionally as Social Repose, American Singer and YouTuber
 Robert Giese (born 1955), American politician
 Tiedemann Giese (1480–1550), Catholic bishop from Danzig, Prince-Bishop of Warmia
 Warren Giese (1924–2013), American politician and football coach
 William C. Giese (1886–1966), American politician and educator

German-language surnames